RNIE 5 is a national highway of Benin with a length of 106.058 km.

References

Roads in Benin